Leesville Road High School (also known locally as Leesville High School, abbreviated as LRHS), is a comprehensive public high school located in Raleigh, North Carolina. It is a part of the Wake County Public School System. Established in 1993, it has approximately 2,800 enrolled students and offers a variety of extracurricular activities, including band, computer science club, solar car team, model UN, foreign language, newspaper, yearbook, National Honor Society, Student Council, Speech and Debate, and many other clubs.

History

The school was established in 1993 as part of Wake County's plan to provide education for the growing northwestern region of the county, which was a larger project including Leesville Road Elementary and Middle School. All three schools lie adjacent to each other on 98 acres, originally costing around $95 million to construct.

Anthony J. "A.J." Mutillo was principal from 2012 until 2018, when he became the district's assistant superintendent for human resources. The News & Observer described him as "popular".

On February 18, 2019 Ian Solomon became principal of the school. He was formerly at Wake Young Men's Leadership Academy.

Academics
Leesville Road High School has consistently ranked as a North Carolina School of Distinction. Leesville Road High School is a high-performing comprehensive high school with nationally recognized academic, athletic, and fine arts programs. It is one of 27 high schools in the Wake County Public School System, the largest school system in the state.  Leesville offers its students a wide variety of advanced and 17 Advanced Placement (AP) courses in various subjects. 28% of their students participate in their AP program. Leesville also offers the following foreign language courses: Spanish, French, and Latin.  In math and English EOC scores, Leesville ranks above the North Carolina average.  In 2005, Leesville scored 90% and 92% in English and Math, higher than the state averages of 82% and 80%. The school's yearbook, The Menagerie, won the Columbia University Scholastic Press Gold Medal in 2004 and 2006.

The school posted the tenth highest average SAT score in the Raleigh-Durham area: 1641 with 76.6% of students taking the test. "AthleticsThe GreatSchools rating is a simple tool for parents to compare schools based on test scores. It compares schools across the state, where the highest rated schools in the state are designated as "Above Average" and the lowest "Below Average." It is designed to be a starting point to help parents make baseline comparisons. We always advise parents to visit the school and consider other information on school performance and programs, as well as consider their child's and family's needs as part of the school selection process."  The school is located in Wake County, North Carolina, an area frequently ranked as one of the nation's best places to live and work. The school system employs over 18,000 staff and faculty to support more than 157,000 students in total.

Athletics 

Leesville Road High School offers varsity and junior varsity teams in football, baseball, men's basketball, women's basketball, men's soccer, women's soccer, cheerleading, volleyball, women's lacrosse, and men's lacrosse and varsity teams only in Men's Tennis, Women's Tennis, Men's Golf, Women's Golf, Swimming/Diving, Gymnastics, Wrestling, Cross Country, Indoor Track and softball.

The school is well known for its football team, which qualified for the NCHSAA 4AA playoffs for 10 consecutive seasons and compiled an 88–28 record over that span. The team also reached the 4AA playoff semi-finals in 2007 and the quarterfinals in 2011 and 2012. The team advanced to its first state championship in 2019, where it fell to Vance High School.

The 2011 Leesville Road baseball team posted the best record in school history going 23–4 and making it to the Eastern Semifinals before falling to Holly Spring and Carlos Rodon. The team was led by Cap-8 Pitcher of the Year Ben Duncan, who compiled a 9–1 record over 55.2 innings while recording 34 strikeouts to 7 walks. Leesville set a school record that year for most runs scored in a single season (217 runs) and team batting average (.338).  The team was led at the plate by seniors Ryan Mulligan (.388), Will Walsh (.329), and Logan Bible (.315) and juniors Jess Noble (.383), Matt Saylor (.351), and Luke Emmett (.303).  Sophomore Mike Kelly batted .358 with 3 homeruns in 88 plate appearances.

The team plays its home games on-campus at Marshall L. Hamilton Stadium, which has a capacity of 3,500, and includes a student section known as the "Leesville Loonies". Leesville soccer and lacrosse teams also play in the same venue.

Leesville women's soccer won the 4A state championship in 2008, 2009, and 2011.

Notable alumni
Clay Aiken, singer and songwriter
Hannah Aspden, U.S. Paralympic swimmer
Braxton Berrios, NFL player
Priscilla Block, country music singer and songwriter
Andrew Britton, author
Grayson Murray, professional golfer with the PGA Tour
Doc Redman, professional golfer
Anthony Richardson, former professional basketball player
Brian Rimpf, former NFL player for the Baltimore Ravens
Shawan Robinson, former professional basketball player
Leigh Smith, javelin thrower at the 2008 Olympics
D.J. Thompson, professional basketball player

References

Wake County Public School System
Public high schools in North Carolina
Schools in Raleigh, North Carolina
1993 establishments in North Carolina
Educational institutions established in 1993